Andreas Lupzig (born 5 August 1968) is a German former professional ice hockey player. He competed in the men's tournament at the 1998 Winter Olympics.

Career statistics

Regular season and playoffs

International

References

External links
 

1968 births
Living people
Olympic ice hockey players of Germany
Ice hockey players at the 1998 Winter Olympics
People from Straubing
Sportspeople from Lower Bavaria
Kölner Haie players
Nürnberg Ice Tigers players
Straubing Tigers players
Heilbronner EC players
Deggendorf Fire players
Chicago Blackhawks draft picks